Berrill is a surname that may refer to:

Sir Kenneth Berrill (1920–2009), English economist and public servant.
Norman John Berrill (1903–1996), English marine biologist.
Paul Berrill (born 1964), English cricketer.
Roland Berrill (1897–1962), Australian co-founder of Mensa.